Zozobra is an American heavy metal band, that was first conceived by Caleb Scofield during 2006. He was joined by Santos Montano for the band's first release, Harmonic Tremors in 2007.  Early Zozobra recordings had a lot in common with the experimental-hardcore of Old Man Gloom and symbolically shares a synonymous name. Zozobra toured the United States with Isis and Jesu in early 2007. Zozobra allowed Caleb Scofield the chance to write his own songs for the first time ever, unlike Cave In and Old Man Gloom. 

Their second album, Bird of Prey, was released on August 5, 2008, and featured Aaron Harris of Isis on drums. Their third full length Savage Masters was released on April 2, 2013. 

Scofield died on March 28, 2018, but contributors to the band's recordings have played multiple live sets of Zozobra songs as a tribute to Scofield.

Discography 
 Harmonic Tremors (Hydra Head Records, 2007)
 Bird of Prey (Hydra Head, 2008)
 Savage Masters (Brutal Panda Records, 2013)

Members 
Current members
 Adam McGrath (Cave In, Clouds, Bodega Girls) – guitar, vocals (2007, 2012–present)
 JR Conners (Cave In) – drums (2012–present)

Past member
 Caleb Scofield (Cave In, Old Man Gloom) – vocals, bass, guitar (2006–2018; died 2018)

Session/touring musicians
 Santos Montano (Old Man Gloom, Forensics) – drums on Harmonic Tremors, live drums (2007-2008)
 Aaron Harris (Isis, Palms) – drums on Bird of Prey
 Jim Carroll (Clouds, Pure Love, United Nations, The Hope Conspiracy) – live guitar, vocals (2007)
 Stephen Brodsky (Cave In) – live bass, vocals (2008)

References

Heavy metal musical groups from New Mexico
American post-metal musical groups
American sludge metal musical groups
Musical groups established in 2006